Diana and Actaeon is a painting by the Italian Renaissance master Titian, finished in 1556–1559, and is considered amongst Titian's greatest works. It portrays the moment in which the hunter Actaeon bursts in where the goddess Diana and her nymphs are bathing. Diana is furious, and will turn Actaeon into a stag, who is then pursued and killed by his own hounds, a scene Titian later painted in his The Death of Actaeon (National Gallery).

Diana is the woman on the right side of the painting. She is wearing a crown with a crescent moon on it and is being covered by the dark skinned woman who may be her servant.  The nymphs display a variety of reactions, and a variety of nude poses.

In 2008–2009, the National Gallery, London and National Galleries of Scotland successfully campaigned to acquire the painting from the Bridgewater Collection for £50 million.  As a result, Diana and Actaeon will remain on display in the UK, and will alternate between the two galleries on five-year terms.

To 2005
Diana and Actaeon is part of a series of seven famous canvases, the "poesies", depicting mythological scenes from Ovid's Metamorphoses painted for Philip II of Spain (after Maximilian II, Holy Roman Emperor had declined Titian's offer to paint them for him). The work remained in the Spanish royal collection until 1704, when King Philip V gave it to the French ambassador. It was soon acquired by Philippe II, Duke of Orléans, nephew of Louis XIV, and Regent of France during the minority of Louis XV, for his collection, one of the finest ever assembled. After the French Revolution, the Orleans collection was sold to a Brussels dealer by Louis Philippe II, Duke of Orléans in 1791, two years before he was guillotined. This dealer then exhibited many pictures from the collection (including the Titians) in London.

The largest share of the collection was thus bought in 1798 by the coal-magnate Francis Egerton, 3rd Duke of Bridgewater, including this painting, Titian's Diana and Callisto (from the same mythological series of seven paintings), eight paintings by Poussin, three Raphaels and Rembrandt's Self-Portrait, aged 51.

The third Duke of Bridgewater was probably inspired to buy the paintings by his nephew, Earl Gower, the ancestor of the Dukes of Sutherland. Certainly, on Bridgewater's death five years after the purchase, he bequeathed the Titians and the rest of the collection to Gower, who put it on display to the public in his London house – it has been on public display ever since. On first seeing the collection there, William Hazlitt wrote "I was staggered when I saw the works ... A new sense came upon me, a new heaven and a new Earth stood before me.". On the outbreak of the Second World War in September 1939, the collection was moved from London to Scotland. Between 1945 and 2009, the Diana and Actaeon and Diana and Callisto (with other paintings from the collection, known collectively as "the Bridgewater loan" or "the Sutherland Loan") were on long-term display at the National Gallery of Scotland, in Edinburgh. As well as Hazlitt, during their time on public display they have inspired artists such as J. M. W. Turner and Lucian Freud — Freud described the pair as "simply the most beautiful pictures in the world".

2008–present
The Sutherland collection has passed by descent to the 7th Duke of Sutherland, (most of whose wealth is contained in the paintings collection), but in late August 2008 the 7th Duke announced that he wished to sell some of the collection in order to diversify his assets. He had offered them as a pair to the British national galleries at £100 million (a third of their overall estimated market price) if they could demonstrate, by the end of 2008, the ability to raise that sum — if not, the pair or other paintings from the Bridgewater collection would be put on public auction early in 2009. Within days of the Duke's decision, the NGS and the National Gallery, London had announced they would combine forces to raise the sum, initially in the form of £50 million (or a demonstration that this money could be raised) to purchase Diana and Actaeon and paid over three years in instalments and then £50 million for Diana and Callisto paid for similarly from 2013.

Though the campaign received some criticism for the Duke's motives or (from John Tusa and Nigel Carrington of the University of the Arts London) for distracting from funding art students, it gained press support from both the tabloid and broadsheet print media in the UK – imitative nude photoshoots of it were featured in both The Sun (using the newspaper's Page 3 models photoshopped onto the painting) and The Mirror (including the actor Kim Cattrall and featured in a piece by Andrew Graham-Dixon on The Culture Show). On 14 October 2008 the appeal received £1 million from the Art Fund and on 19 November this was followed by £10 million from the National Heritage Memorial Fund. From 22 October to 14 December 2008 it was put on display in Room 1 of the National Gallery in London to aid the public appeal – the only other painting in this temporary exhibition was the related The Death of Actaeon from the London National Gallery's collection, and they were illustrated by the relevant passages from Book 3 of Ovid's Metamorphoses in the John Dryden translation.

Speculation began when the original 31 December deadline passed without definite news and the Scottish Government's announcement of a contribution of £17.5 million in January 2009 triggered a political row, with Ian Davidson questioning the deal at a time of economic hardship. There was also controversy over attempts to dilute the guarantee that the duke would sell no other of the paintings from the Sutherland Loan should the two Titians be bought. However, on 2 February 2009 it was announced that, thanks to the deadline being extended to raise more funds and finalise the payment plan for Diana and Callisto, the £50 million had been raised and Diana and Actaeon would be acquired. The final sum was made up of £12.5 million from the Scottish Government, £7.4 million from public donations, £12.5 million from the National Galleries in London, £10 million from the National Heritage Memorial Fund, £2 million from the Monument Trust, £4.6 million from the National Galleries of Scotland and £1 million was secured from the Art Fund. Diana and Actaeon will thus be displayed in Scotland for five years, then in London alongside The Death of Actaeon for five years, on an alternating basis.

Titian's poesie series for Philip II 
 Danaë, delivered to Philip 1553, now Wellington Collection, with earlier and later versions.
 Venus and Adonis, Museo del Prado, delivered 1554, and several other versions
 The Rape of Europa, c. 1560–62, Isabella Stewart Gardner Museum
 Diana and Actaeon, 1556–59, owned jointly by London's National Gallery and the National Gallery of Scotland in Edinburgh
 Diana and Callisto, 1556–59, owned jointly by London's National Gallery and the National Gallery of Scotland in Edinburgh
 Perseus and Andromeda, Wallace Collection, c. 1553–62
 The Death of Actaeon, National Gallery, never delivered and not always counted in the series, c. 1559 onwards

See also
 List of most expensive paintings

Notes

References
Brigstocke, Hugh; Italian and Spanish Paintings in the National Gallery of Scotland, 2nd Edn, 1993, National Galleries of Scotland,

External links
High definition image on Google art
Diana and Actaeon – National Galleries of Scotland catalogue entry

1556 paintings
1557 paintings
1558 paintings
1559 paintings
Paintings depicting Diana (mythology)
Paintings by Titian in the National Gallery, London
Paintings in the National Galleries of Scotland
2008 in the United Kingdom
Nude art
Paintings based on Metamorphoses
Dogs in paintings by Titian
Bathing in art
Paintings formerly in the Spanish royal collection
Mythological paintings by Titian